Randell Scott Gomez (born February 4, 1957) is a former Major League Baseball catcher. He played in 14 games for the San Francisco Giants during the 1984 season.

External links

Major League Baseball catchers
San Francisco Giants players
Baseball players from California
1957 births
Living people
Hawaii Islanders players
Great Falls Giants players
Phoenix Giants players
Shreveport Captains players
Fresno Giants players
Phoenix Firebirds players
Junípero Serra High School (San Mateo, California) alumni
Utah Utes baseball players